Penshaw Bridge, also known as Fatfield Bridge, is a road traffic bridge spanning the River Wear in North East England, linking Penshaw with Fatfield. The bridge was opened on 29 January 1890.

References

Bridges across the River Wear
Bridges completed in 1890
Bridges in Tyne and Wear
Transport in the City of Sunderland